Mark Anthony Grater (born January 19, 1964) is an American former professional baseball pitcher. Grater played in nine games over parts of two seasons for the St. Louis Cardinals and the Detroit Tigers of  Major League Baseball (MLB). He batted and threw right-handed.

Grater attended Monaca High School in Monaca, Pennsylvania and began his college baseball career at the Community College of Beaver County.

As of 2011, Grater was in his eighteenth year as a pitching coach and was working for the Washington Nationals as their pitching rehabilitation coordinator. Prior to the 2021 season, he was named Washington's rehabilitation and Dominican Republic  pitching coordinator.

References

External links

, or Retrosheet
Pura Pelota (Venezuelan Winter League)

1964 births
Living people
American expatriate baseball players in Canada
Arkansas Travelers players
Baseball players from Pennsylvania
Calgary Cannons players
Detroit Tigers players
FIU Panthers baseball players
Florida International University alumni
Johnson City Cardinals players
Junior college baseball players in the United States
Louisville Redbirds players
Major League Baseball pitchers
Minor league baseball coaches
People from Rochester, Pennsylvania
Savannah Cardinals players
Springfield Cardinals players
St. Louis Cardinals players
St. Petersburg Cardinals players
Tiburones de La Guaira players
American expatriate baseball players in Venezuela
Tigres de Aragua players
Toledo Mud Hens players